Chris Hooper (born December 24, 1991) is an American basketball player from Harlem, New York playing in the Pro A German League.

Early life 

Hooper attended Arturo A. Schomburg Satellite Academy in the Bronx. During his senior year at Satellite Academy, he averaged 12.3 points and 11.3 rebounds. After graduating from high school, he played one season at both Kaskaskia College in Illinois and at Odessa College in  Texas. While at Kaskaskia, Hooper averaged 11.7 points and 9.0 rebounds per game and helped lead the squad to a 20–11 record. At Odessa, he contributed 6.9 points and 5.8 rebounds per game.

Hooper then transferred to St. Francis College in Brooklyn, New York, where he had two years remaining of eligibility. With the St. Francis Brooklyn Terriers, he helped win a regular-season NEC Championship and participated in the National Invitation Tournament. In his first season with the Terriers, Hooper started 28 games and averaged 5.7 points per games and 4.2 rebounds per game. In his senior year, Hooper raised his statistics by averaging 11.5 points per game and 5.0 rebounds per game. Additionally, Hooper converted 59.1 percent of his shot opportunities to rank fourth in the NEC and was selected to the 2015–16 NEC men's basketball All-Conference third team.

Statistics

Professional career 
After graduating from St. Francis College, Hooper agreed with M.A.C. Sports Management & Consulting to represent him as he looked to Europe for a team to sign with. On July 22, 2016, he signed his first professional contract with the Reading Rockets of the English Basketball League. On September 17, 2016, Hooper played in his first professional game for the Reading Rockets as they lost to the Worthing Thunder, 71–78, in a Men's National Trophy Game. Hooper led his team in scoring with 22 points. In his second professional game, Hooper again lead his team in scoring with 26 points, and recorded 8 rebounds with 3 steals.

After his first full season, Hooper was selected as the Eurobasket.com All-British NBL Division One League Player of the Year by Eurobasket.com. He was also selected as the Center of the Year and the Import of the Year. Hooper averaged 22.4 points and 12.3 rebounds per game, and led the Reading Rockets (United Kingdom) to a 27–10 record in his debut season.

References

External links 
St. Francis Brooklyn bio

1991 births
Living people
Power forwards (basketball)
St. Francis Brooklyn Terriers men's basketball players
Odessa Wranglers men's basketball players
American men's basketball players
People from Harlem
Sportspeople from Manhattan
Basketball players from New York City